James Chitalu (born 15 December 1961) is a Zambian former footballer. He competed in the men's tournament at the 1988 Summer Olympics.

References

External links
 
 

1961 births
Living people
Zambian footballers
Zambia international footballers
Olympic footballers of Zambia
Footballers at the 1988 Summer Olympics
Place of birth missing (living people)
Association football defenders
Kabwe Warriors F.C. players